Valle Gómez metro station is a Mexico City Metro station within the limits of Gustavo A. Madero and Venustiano Carranza, in Mexico City. It is an underground station with two side platforms, served by Line 5 (the Yellow Line), between Misterios and Consulado stations. Valle Gómez station serves the colonias of 7 de Noviembre and Valle Gómez; the station receives its name from the latter. The station's pictogram features an agave plant. Valle Gómez metro station was opened on 1 July 1982, on the first day of the La Raza–Pantitlán service.  In 2019, the station had an average daily ridership of 4,416 passengers, making it the 190th busiest station in the network and the least busy of the line.

Location

Valle Gómez is a metro station along Río Consulado Avenue, in northeastern Mexico City. The station serves the colonias (Mexican Spanish for "neighborhoods") of 7 de Noviembre, in Gustavo A. Madero, and Valle Gómez, in Venustiano Carranza. Within the system, the station lies between Misterios and Consulado stations. The area is serviced by Routes 5-A and 20-A of the city's public bus system and by Route 200 of the Red de Transporte de Pasajeros network.

Exits
There are two exits:
North: Río Consulado Norte Avenue and Norte 50 Street, 7 de Noviembre, Gustavo A. Madero.
South: Río Consulado Sur Avenue and Real del Monte Avenue, Valle Gómez, Venustiano Carranza.

History and construction
Line 5 of the Mexico City Metro was built by Cometro, a subsidiary of Empresas ICA; in the Valle Gómez–Misterios stretch, workers uncovered part of a road that connected Tenochtitlan with the Tepeyac hill. The road was built with materials dating from the Mesoamerican Postclassic Period.

Valle Gómez metro station is an underground station that was opened on 1 July 1982, on the first day of the La Raza–Pantitlán service. The interstation stretch between Valle Gómez and Consulado stations goes from underground to the at-grade level and it is 679 m (2,227 ft) long; the Misterios–Valle Gómez tunnel is 969 m (3,179 ft) long.

The station's pictogram represents an agave plant, and the station is named after the Valle Gómez family, owners of the former La Vaquita paddock, where agave plants would grow. There is an Internet café inside the station.

Incidents
According to the system authorities, the Consulado–Valle Gómez section is a common zone of copper wire thefts, which potentially can create fires in the tracks. From 23 April to 15 June 2020, the station was temporarily closed due to the COVID-19 pandemic in Mexico. In the Misterios–Valle Gómez tunnel, a train window was ejected and caused a short circuit on 21 February 2021.

Ridership
According to the data provided by the authorities since the 2000s, commuters have averaged per year between 2,300 and 4,900 daily entrances in the last decade. In 2019, before the impact of the COVID-19 pandemic on public transport, the station's ridership totaled 1,611,907 passengers, which was a decrease of 50,385 passengers compared to 2018. In the same year, Valle Gómez metro station was the 189th busiest station in the system and it was the line's least used station.

Gallery

Notes

References

External links

1982 establishments in Mexico
Mexico City Metro Line 5 stations
Mexico City Metro stations in Gustavo A. Madero, Mexico City
Mexico City Metro stations in Venustiano Carranza, Mexico City
Railway stations located underground in Mexico
Railway stations opened in 1982